El Gallego in Spanish means 'The Galician', but Cubans apply it to anyone likened to Spanish working class immigrants, hence it is often combined with given names of Cubans and quoted in literature.

References and notes

Galician diaspora
Slang
Spanish-Cuban culture